Olavi Vuorisalo (born 5 April 1933) is a Finnish middle-distance runner. He competed in the men's 1500 metres at the 1960 Summer Olympics.

References

External links
 

1933 births
Living people
Athletes (track and field) at the 1960 Summer Olympics
Finnish male middle-distance runners
Olympic athletes of Finland
Place of birth missing (living people)